Greg Wieczorek (aka G. Wiz) is a New York City based drummer, percussionist, vocalist and songwriter. Born in Baltimore Maryland, Greg has recorded and performed internationally with: Norah Jones, Joseph Arthur, The Lonely Astronauts, The Autumn Defense, (w/ John Stirratt and Pat Sansone of Wilco), The Twilight Singers, and many others. He recently finished a world tour with Norah Jones in support of her latest release, “Day Breaks” (Blue Note/EMI).

Discography
Joseph Arthur - (Redemption's Son) - 2002 - *appears as Greg Wiz
Joseph Arthur - (Junkyard Hearts) - EP Vol. II & IV - 2002 - *as Greg Wiz
The Autumn Defense -Circles  - 2003 - *as Greg Wiz
The Twilight Singers - (Blackberry Belle) - 2003
Joseph Arthur - (Our Shadows Will Remain) - 2004 - *as Greg Whiz
C.C. Adcock - (Lafayette Marquis) - 2004 - *as G-Whiz
The Honorary Title - (Anything Else But The Truth) - 2004
Nervous cabaret- Nervous Cabaret - 2005
Joseph Arthur - (The Invisible Parade & We Almost Made It) - 2006 - *as Greg Wiz
The Twilight Singers - (Powder Burns) - 2006 
The Twilight Singers - (A Stitch In Time) - EP - 2006
The Autumn Defense - The Autumn Defense - 2007
Joseph Arthur & The Lonely Astronauts - (Let's Just Be) - 2007
Nervous cabaret - Drop, Drop - 2007
The Gutter Twins - (Saturnalia) - 2008
Joseph Arthur & The Lonely Astronauts - (Temporary People) - 2008
Joseph Arthur - (Vagabond Skies) - 2008
Joseph Arthur - (Nuclear Daydream) - European release - 2009 - *as G.Wiz
Norah Jones - (The Fall) - Deluxe Edition - 2009
The Autumn Defense - Once Around (CD) - Yep Roc - 2010
The Music Never Stopped - Original Motion Picture Soundtrack - 2011
The Twilight Singers - (Dynamite Steps) - 2011
The Twilight Singers - Live In New York - 2011
Matt Mays - "Coyote" - 2012
Matt Keating - Wrong Way Home - 2012
Joseph Arthur - (The Ballad of Boogie Christ) - 2013
The Candles - (La Candelaria) - 2013
The Autumn Defense - (Fifth) - 2014
Norah Jones - (Beck - Song Reader compilation) - 2014
Matt Keating - (This Perfect Crime) - 2015
Ruby Amanfu - (Standing Still) - 2015
George Fest - [A Night To Celebrate The Music of George Harrison) - 2016
Matt Butler - (Reckless Son) - 2016
The Candles - (Matter + Spirit) - 2016
Aloysius 3 - (Aloysius 3) - EP - 2017
Telescope - (Siamese Connection) - 2017
Tom Irwin - (All That Love) - 2017
Linda Perhacs w/ The Autumn Defense - (I'm A Harmony) - 2017
Salad - (Where's My Salad?) - EP - 2017
The Make Pretend - (Fortune Factory) - 2017
Olivia Valentine - (Can't Be Trusted) - EP - 2017
Liam Hayes - (Korp Sole Roller) - 2018
Telescope - (Pictures With Captions) - EP - 2018

References 

Musicians from New York City
American rock drummers
Year of birth missing (living people)
Living people
The Twilight Singers members
The Lonely Astronauts members